The Tate River is a river located in Far North Queensland, Australia.

The headwaters of the river rise under Three Mile Mountain in the Great Dividing Range. Formed by the confluence of the Packsaddle Creek and California Creek, the river flows east through the Bullings Claim mineral occurrence and several mine sites, joined by nine tributaries including the Rocky Tate River and Sandy Tate River. The river eventually discharges into the Lynd River, west of Torwood. Eventually the Lynd discharges into the Mitchell River. The Tate River descends  over its  course.

The river was named in 1872 in honour of the explorer and botanist, Thomas Tate, by the explorer and leader of his expedition, William Hann.

See also

References

Rivers of Far North Queensland